Zhouguanqiao Township is a township in Shaodong, Hunan, China.

Administrative division
As of 2017, the township is divided into twenty-nine villages: 
 Xi'an
 Laoshanchong
 Zhouzhu
 Wenggongci
 Cheni
 Shengli
 Yangtang
 Simachong
 Xiaojiachong
 Putangchong
 Hanjing
 Qiaokou
 Daquanchong
 Huangdu
 Zhongxin
 Hejiaqiao
 Qiaotang
 Chejia
 Xianfeng
 Yangzhu
 Honghe
 Zhouhe
 Tongcheba
 Sanduo
 Jiansheng
 Aixin
 Sansheng
 Hejia
 Tianxing

Geography
Tong River flows through fifteen villages of the township.

Economy
The local economy is primarily based upon agriculture and local industry. Leather is a major industry.

Transport
Provincial Highway S336 and County Road X020 pass across the township northwest to southeast.

References

Divisions of Shaodong